Antecosuchus is an extinct genus of bauriid therocephalians.

See also
 List of therapsids

References

Bauriids
Middle Triassic synapsids
Extinct animals of Russia
Fossil taxa described in 1973
Taxa named by Leonid Petrovich Tatarinov
Therocephalia genera